Ecton may refer to:

Placenames
Ecton, Northamptonshire, village and civil parish in the Borough of Wellingborough, England
Ecton, Staffordshire, hamlet in the Staffordshire Peak District, England

Surnames
John Ecton (died 1730), English compiler
Zales Ecton (1898–1961), United States senator

Other
Ecton (physics), an explosive electron emission